Käsukonna is a village in Järva Parish, Järva County in central Estonia.

On 7 September 2015, Hermani village was established by detaching the land from Käsukonna village.

References

Villages in Järva County
Kreis Fellin